Brigadier general Morton Gousse, a Haitian military officer, served as the Acting Commander-in-Chief of the Armed Forces of Haiti from 17 to 19 June 1988, under the presidency of Leslie Manigat. He was appointed by Manigat following the dismissal of Henri Namphy, and dismissed only two days later, after Namphy staged the June 1988 Haitian coup d'état.

References

Haitian military personnel
Haitian generals
Possibly living people
Year of birth missing